Botanical gardens in Chile have collections consisting entirely of Chile native and endemic species; most have a collection that include plants from around the world. There are botanical gardens and arboreta in all states and territories of Chile, most are administered by local governments, some are privately owned.

 Arboretum de la Universidad Austral de Chile
 Jardín Botánico Chagual
 Jardín Botánico Nacional, Viña del Mar
 Parque Botánico Omara
 Jardín Botánico Chileflora

References 

Chile
Botanical gardens